Kovářská is a market town in Chomutov District in the Ústí nad Labem Region of the Czech Republic. It has about 1,000 inhabitants.

Geography
It lies in the Ore Mountains. The stream Černá voda flows through the market town and forms a valley.

History

The origin of Kovářská is associated with the mining and processing of iron ore. Until the 19th century, it was almost the only source of livelihood for the locals. In 1599, one of the first blast furnaces in Bohemia was built here.

With the development of iron production, the village flourished. However, it was interrupted by post-White Mountain confiscations, subsequent re-Catholicization, when Protestants went to Saxony rather than renounce their faith, and then the Thirty Years' War, which hit Kovářská severely, especially in 1639–1641. 

Iron processing recovered after the war and then again after the famine in 1772. In 1780, Kovářská had almost 2,000 inhabitants. However, after the Napoleonic Wars the iron processing was maintained only with difficulty, and after several decades the operation was stopped. The town has reoriented itself to other types of industry: production of canned fish, matches, velvet, yarn and thread.

In 1883, Kovářská became a market town.

On 11 September 1944, one of the greatest air battles of World War II over the territory of Czechoslovakia, the "Air battle over the Ore Mountains", took place over Kovářská. Since 1994, an annual international meeting of aviation veterans is organized in Kovářská.

After the World War II, the German population was expelled. The German name Schmiedeberg ("smithy hill") was changed to Kovářská (kovář = "smith").

Sights

The main landmark is the baroque Church of Saint Michael, built in 1709–1710. In front of the church there is a baroque Marian column from 1706.

A museum dedicated to the Air battle over the Ore Mountains (and to air wars in 1939–1945 overall) is located in Kovářská.

Twin towns – sister cities

Kovářská is twinned with:
 Sehmatal, Germany

References

External links

Populated places in Chomutov District
Villages in the Ore Mountains